Serpocaulon lasiopus is a species of fern in the family Polypodiaceae. It is widespread in South America. Under the synonym Polypodium argyrolepis, it was regarded as endemic to Ecuador and threatened by habitat loss.

References

Polypodiaceae
Flora of South America
Taxonomy articles created by Polbot
Taxobox binomials not recognized by IUCN